Mark Pabai (born 30 September 2000) is a Liberian professional footballer who plays as a defender for Slovenian club Tabor Sežana and the Liberia national team.

Club career
Pabai is a youth academy graduate of Utrecht. He made his professional debut for the club's reserve side on 8 March 2019 in a 3–1 defeat against Jong PSV. On 3 August 2021, he joined Eredivisie club PEC Zwolle on a two-year deal.

On 20 January 2022, he signed a two-and-a-half year contract with Serie B club SPAL in Italy. On 1 September 2022, Pabai's contract with SPAL was terminated by mutual consent.

International career
In October 2021, Pabai received a call-up from Liberia for two 2022 World Cup qualifying matches against Cape Verde. He debuted in a 2–0 World Cup qualification loss to Nigeria on 13 November 2021.

Personal life
Born in Liberia, Pabai moved to the Netherlands with his family when he was six years old.

Career statistics

Club

International

References

External links
 

2000 births
Living people
Sportspeople from Monrovia
Association football defenders
Liberian footballers
Liberia international footballers
Eerste Divisie players
Eredivisie players
Serie B players
Slovenian PrvaLiga players
Jong FC Utrecht players
PEC Zwolle players
S.P.A.L. players
NK Tabor Sežana players
Liberian expatriate footballers
Liberian expatriate sportspeople in the Netherlands
Expatriate footballers in the Netherlands
Liberian expatriate sportspeople in Italy
Expatriate footballers in Italy
Liberian expatriate sportspeople in Slovenia
Expatriate footballers in Slovenia